Eslamabad-e Gharb (also Romanized as Eslāmābād-e Gharb; also known as Eslāmābād, Shāhābād, and Shāhābād-e Gharb), is a city and capital of Eslamabad-e Gharb County, Kermanshah Province, Iran. At the 2006 census, its population was 89,430, in 20,956 families. It is the second largest city in the province and is known for its oak trees.

Demographics 
The city is populated by Kurds.

Infrastructure

Roads
Road 48 (Iran) passes by the city through the ring road. The Kermanshah-Eslamabad-e Gharb part of Kermanshah-Khosravi highway was expanded into a four-lane road long before the Eslamabad-e Gharb-Sarpol-e Zahab part. Its first section was expanded in October 1998. It is also connected to road 17 (Iran) and road 19 (Iran). Road 19 is also known as the Ahvaz road in the city and there's a road sign indicating the name Ahvaz.

Rail
The Kermanshah-Eslamabad-e Gharb line of Rahahane Gharb is planned to be completed by 1403 Iranian year.

See also 

 Mojtaba Bakhshipour, the current representative of the city in the Parliament
Kalhor
Ghalajeh tunnel
Gilan-e Gharb
Eyvan

References

Populated places in Eslamabad-e Gharb County
Cities in Kermanshah Province
Kurdish settlements in Kermanshah Province